Tarache delecta, the delightful bird dropping moth, is a bird dropping moth in the family Noctuidae. The species was first described by Francis Walker in 1858.

The MONA or Hodges number for Tarache delecta is 9146.

References

Further reading

External links
 

Acontiinae
Articles created by Qbugbot
Moths described in 1858